Hongo Tameike is an earthen dam located in Nara prefecture in Japan. The dam is used for agriculture. The catchment area of the dam is 4.3 km2. The dam impounds about 4  ha of land when full and can store 512 thousand cubic meters of water. The construction of the dam was completed in 1935.

References

Dams in Nara Prefecture
1935 establishments in Japan